The Africa Movie Academy Award for Best Film in an African Language is an annual merit by the Africa Film Academy to recognize the best African film in an indigenous language. It was first awarded in the first edition as Best Indigenous Film. However, it was renamed to Best Film in an African Language award from the 5th to 9th edition. Since the 10th edition it has been used to immortalize Sembene Ousmane and consequently renamed to Sembene Ousmane Awards for Best Film in African Language.

References

Africa Movie Academy Awards
Awards for best film
Lists of award winners